Sahitya Akademi Award is given by the Sahitya Akademi, India's national academy of letters to one writer every year in each of the languages recognized by it as well as for translations. This is the second highest literary award of India, after Jnanpith Award. The awards given to Bengali writers for works in Bengali and English as well as for translations from Bengali literature are given below.

Sahitya Akademi Award winners 
Following is the list of Akademi Award winners. No awards were conferred in 1960, 1968 and 1973.

Sahitya Akademi Bal Sahitya Puraskar winners

Sahitya Akademi Youth Award winners

Bengali winners of Sahitya Akademi Award for English

Translations from Bengali literature 
1989 – Nagindas Parekh – Na Hanyate (novel, Gujarati tr. from Maitreyi Devi),
 ... ... K. Ravi Verma – Ganadevata (novel, Malayalam tr. from Tarashankar Bandyopadhyay),
 ... ... T.Thoibi Devi – Drishtipat (novel, Manipuri tr. from Yayavar),
 ... ... Basanta Kumari Devi – Ganadebata, Parts I and II (Panchagram) (novel, Oriya tr. from Tarashankar Bandyopadhyay),
 ... ... B. Gopala Reddi – Ravindruni Natikalu (plays, Telugu tr. from Rabindranath Thakur)
1990 – Ramanik Meghanee – Gandevata (novel, Gujarati tr. from Tarashankar Bandyopadhyay),
 ... ... Upendranath Jha 'Vyas' – Vipradas (novel, Maithili tr. from Sharat Chandra Chattopadhyay),
 ... ... A. Shyamsundar Singh – Krishnakantagee Uil  (novel, Manipuri tr. from Bankim Chandra Chattopadhyay),
 ... ... Amar Bharati – Ikki Kahaniyan (short stories, Punjabi tr. from Rabindranath Thakur),
 ... ... Laxmi Narayan Mohanty – Banachari (novel, Oriya tr. from Bibhuti Bhushan Bandyopadhyay),
 ... ... Biharilal Chhabria - Sat Kadam (Two Parts) (novel, Sindhi tr. from Tarashankar Bandyopadhyay)
1991 – Ramanlal Soni – Kabuliwala (short stories, Gujarati tr. from Rabindranath Thakur),
 ... ... Shanti Ranjan Bhattacharya – Gulshan-e-Sehat (novel, Urdu tr. from Tarashankar Bandyopadhyay)
1993 – Anila A. Dalal – Prachchhanna (novel, Gujarati tr. from Bimal Kar),
 ... ... Olivinho Gomes – Anandmath (novel, Konkani tr. from Bankim Chandra Chattopadhyay),
 ... ... Leela Sarkar – Aranyathinte Adhikaaram (novel, Malayalam tr. from Mahashweta Devi),
 ... ... L. Raghumani Sharma – Charitraheen (novel, Manipuri tr. from Sharat Chandra Chattopadhyay),
 ... ... Barendra Krushna Dhal – Samba (novel, Oriya tr. from Samaresh Basu),
 ... ... Vilas Gite – Rabindranathanchya Sahavasat (poetry, Marathi tr. from Maitreyi Devi),
 ... ... Maddipattla Suri – Samayam Kani Samayam (novel, Telugu tr. from Bimal Kar)
1994 – Basundhara Saikia –Datta  (novel, Assamese tr. from Sharat Chandra Chattopadhyay),
 ... ... Karna Thami – Sukanta Ka Kavitaharu (poetry, Nepali tr. from Sukanta Bhattacharya)
1995 – Kulanath Gogoi – Aranyer Adhikar (novel, Assamese tr. from Mahashweta Devi),
 ... ... Surendra Jha 'Suman' – Rabindra Natakavali Vol. I (plays, Maithili tr. from Rabindranath Thakur),
 ... ... P. Bhanumanthi – Meethi Charithram (play, Tamil tr. from Badal Sarkar)
1996 – Aruna Chakrabarti – Srikanta (novel, English tr. from Sharat Chandra Chattopadhyay),
 ... ... Chandrakant Mehta – Jeevan Swad (novel, Gujarati tr. from Ashapurna Devi)
1997 – Gayatri Chakrabarti Spivak – Imaginary Maps (short stories, English tr. from Mahashweta Devi),
 ... ... Prasad Brahmbhatt – Amritasya Putri (novel, Gujarati tr. from Kamal Das),
 ... ... Shiva Shamsher Rasaily – Biraj Dulahi (novel, Nepali tr. from Sharat Chandra Chattopadhyay),
 ... ... Jugal Kishor Dutta – Asami Hazir (novel, Oriya tr. from Bimal Mitra)
1998 – Kalpana Bardhan – Wives and Others (short stories & a novel, English tr. from Manik Bandyopadhyay),
 ... ... Chandranath Mishra 'Amar' – Parashuramak Beechhal - Berayal Katha (short stories, Maithili tr. from Parashuram),
 ... ... Bihari Lal Mishra – Sharatsaptakam (short stories, Sanskrit tr. from Sharat Chandra Chattopadhyay),
 ... ... Lakhmi Khilani – Asamaya (novel, Sindhi tr. from Bimal Kar)
1999 – Suknaya Jhaveri – Ekvis Bengali Vartao (short stories, Gujarati tr. from different authors),
 ... ... Murari Madhusudan Thakur – Arogya Niketan (novel, Maithili tr. from Tarashankar Bandyopadhyay)
2000 – Hans Raj Pandotra – Gosain De Bagha Da Bhoot (novel, Dogri tr. from Shirshendu Mukhopadhyay),
 ... ... Amresh Patnaik – Tista Tatora Brutanta (novel, Oriya tr. from Debesh Ray),
 ... ... Dipak Ghosh – Sanskritaravindrasangitam (songs, Sanskrit tr. from Rabindranath Thakur)
2001 – Gopa Majumdar –Aparajito (novel, English tr. from Bibhuti Bhushan Bandyopadhyay),
 ... ... Janaki Ballav Patnaik – Bankima Upanyasmala (2 Volumes) (novels, Oriya tr. from Bankim Chandra Chattopadhyay)
2003 – (Lt.) Sujit Mukhopadhyay – Gora (novel, English tr. from Rabindranath Thakur),
 ... ... Rajen Saikia – Putul Nachar Itikat (novel, Assamese tr. from Manik Bandyopadhyay),
 ... ... M.P. Kumaran – Heerak Deepti  (novel, Malayalam tr. from Sunil Gangopadhyay),
 ... ... Ram Swaroop Kisan – Rati Kaner (play, Rajasthani tr. from Rabindranath Thakur)
2004 – Ramshankar Dwivedi – Jhansi Ki Rani (novel, Hindi tr. from Mahashweta Devi),
 ... ... Madhav Borcar – Ekshe Ek Kavita (poetry, Konkani tr. from Rabindranath Thakur),
 ... ... Nongthombam Kunjamohan Singh – Gora (novel, Manipuri tr. from Rabindranath Thakur),
 ... ... Mrinalini Prabhakar Gadkari – Devdas  (novel, Marathi tr. from Sharat Chandra Chattopadhyay)
2005 – Uma Randeria – Nava Yugnu Parodh  (novel, Gujarati tr. from Sunil Gangopadhyay)
2006 – Rajnand Jha – Kaalbela  (novel, Maithili tr. from Samaresh Majumdar)
 ... ... Puviarasu – Puratchikaaran  (poetry, Tamil tr. from Kazi Nazrul Islam)
2007 – Bachchan Singh<ref
name="Jagran">Hindi News |Hindi News Headlines | Hindi News Online – Yahoo! Jagran Hindi News</ref> – Mahabharat ki Katha  (treatise, Hindi tr. from Buddhadeb Basu)
2009 – Jatindra Kumar Bargohain – Lokayata Darshan  (philosophy, Assamese tr. from Devi Prasad Chattopadhyay)
 ... ... .Kasturi Desai<ref
name="Jagranjosh">साहित्य अकादमी अनुवाद पुरस्कार वर्ष 2009</ref> – Adhikar Aranyacho  (novel, Konkani tr. from Mahashweta Devi)
 ... ... .Bhuvana Natarajan – Mudhal Sabadam  (novel, Tamil tr. from Ashapoorna Devi)
2010 – Tarapati Upadhyay – Anand Math  (novel, Nepali tr. from Bankim Chandra Chattopadhyay)
2012 – Swarna Prabha Chainary – Nwizise Sungdo Solo (short stories, Bodo tr. from Rabindranath Thakur)
 ... ... .Anand – Kavi Bandya Ghatigayiyute Jeevithavum Maranavum (novel, Malayalam tr. from Mahashweta Devi)
 ... ... .Elangbam Sonamani Singh – Dharma Tattwa (Prose, Manipuri tr. from Bankim Chandra Chattopadhyay)
 ... ... .Purn Sharma 'Puran' – Gora (novel, Rajasthani tr. from Rabindranath Thakur)
 ... ... .Rabindranath Murmu – Ita Chetan Re Ita (novel, Santali tr. from Mahashweta Devi)
Note – From English – In 1992, Hijam Guno Singh got this prize for Manipuri translation of History of Bengali Literature by Sukumar Sen. In 1991, Radhika Mohan Bhagowati got this prize for Assamese translation of The Story of Our Newspapers by Chanchal Sarkar. In 2012, Sharda Sathe got it for Marathi translation of A Traveller and the Road by Mohit Sen.

Translations into Bengali 
1989 – Nileena Abraham – Patummar Chhagal O Balyasakhi (short stories, tr. from Malayalam)
1990 – Maitri Shukla – Unish Bigha Dui Katha (novel, tr. from Oriya)
1991 – Subramanian Krishnamoorthy – Raktabanya (novel, tr. from Tamil)
1992 – Maya Gupta – Kak O Kala Pani (short stories, tr. from Hindi)
1993 – Manabendra Bandyopadhyay – Vaikom Muhammad Bashirer Shreshtha Galpo (short stories, tr. from Malayalam)
1994 – Vina Alase – Gulamgiri (dialogues, tr. from Marathi)
1995 – Kanailal Datta – Vinoba Bhave Rachanabali (autobiographical writing, tr. from Hindi)
1996 – Ranendranath Bandyopadhyay – Sarpa O Rajju (novel, tr. from English)
1997 – Rameshwar shaw – Bhabishyater Kabita (essays, tr. from English)
1998 – Jaya Mitra – Jipsy Nadir Dhara (autobiographical writing, tr. from Punjabi)
1999 – Shankha Ghosh – Raktakalyan (Taledanda Play, tr. from Kannada)
2000 – Afsar Ahmed & Kalim Hazique – Sare Tin Hat Bhume (novel, tr. from Urdu)
2001 – Nani Sur – Krishna Chanderer Nirbachito Galpo (short stories, tr. from Urdu)
2002 – Usha Ranjan Bhattacharya – Mriityunjay (novel, tr. from Assamese)
2003 – Malay Ray Chaudhuri – Suryer Saptam Ashwa (novel, tr. from Hindi) (refused)
2004 – Sujit Chaudhuri – Asamiya Galpo Sankalan (short stories, tr. from Assamese)
2005 – Ranjan Bandyopadhyay – Kabir Bijak O Anyanya Kabita (poetry, tr. from Hindi)
2006 – Jyoti Bhushan Chaki<ref
name="Muslims"/> – Kaifi Azmir Kabita (poetry, tr. from Urdu)
2007 – Subimal Basak<ref
name="Jagran"/> – Aamar Tomar Taar Katha (novel, tr. from Hindi)
2008 – Bharati Nandi – Chitrita Andhakar (novel, tr. from Oriya)
2009 – Ujjal Singha – Mitro Marjani (novel of Krishna Sovti, tr. from Hindi) 
2010 – Shyamal Bhattacharya – Kumari Harinir Chokh (short stories, tr. from Punjabi)
2011 – Jagat Debnath – Raghaber Din Rat  (novel, tr. from Marathi)
2012 – Oinam Nilkantha Singh – Bristi Ar Holo Na (short story, tr. from Manipuri)
2013 – Soma Bandyopadhyay – Gathanbad, Uttar-Gathanbad Ebang Prachya Kavyatattva (literary criticism, tr. from Urdu)
2014 – Binay Kumar Mahata – Ei Prithibi Paglagarad (novel, tr. from Maithili)
2015 – Mau Das Gupta – Anamdaser Puthi (novel, tr. from Hindi)
2016 - Gita Chaudhuri – Satyer Anwesan (Gandhi's autobiography, tr. from Gujarati)
2017 - (Late) Utpal Kumar Basu – Kebal Atmai Jane Kibhabe Gan Gaite Hay: Nirbachita Kabita (poetry, tr. from English)
2018 - Mabinul Haq - Lep O Anyanyo Galpo (short stories, tr from Urdu)

(Note: when this article was created in 2007, the list of awardees in various categories was taken from the official site of the Sahitya Akademi. The site has since been revamped and currently does not show any list of awardees; instead it shows a search option for awardees with specified search parameters. For the old version of the site, click here. It gives details about the main awards up to 2007 and translation prizes up to 2005.)

References

Further reading
Sahitya Akademi Award
Jnanpith Award

External links
 
 https://www.webcitation.org/6HzFvmI7b?url=http://www.calcuttaweb.com/lit.shtml

Sahitya Akademi

Bengali